Ignacio "Iñaki" Rueda (born 6 August 1978) is a Spanish Formula One engineer who was the Head of Race Strategy and Sporting for Formula One team Scuderia Ferrari from 2021-2023.

Career

Rueda started his career in motorsport when he raced in motocross from 1991 to 1999 while from 1997 to 2003, he was enrolled at the University of Colorado, graduating with a degree in Mechanical Engineering, specialising in Vehicle Dynamics, Controls and Systems.

Eager to work in Formula One, Rueda completed a motorsport master's degree at Cranfield University, UK. Shortly after that, he worked for McLaren Electronics but he wanted to work trackside so in 2005, he joined Jordan Grand Prix, as a Systems Engineer. In 2006 he joined the Renault team, in the same role.

In 2011, Rueda was appointed Chief Strategist of Lotus F1 Team, a role in which he kept until 2014. He then transferred to Scuderia Ferrari as the Head of Race Strategy. In January 2021, he was appointed Sporting Director of Scuderia Ferrari. In February 2023, he was replaced as Strategy Director by Ravin Jain.

References

1978 births
Living people
Spanish engineers
21st-century engineers
Ferrari people
Renault people
McLaren people